Gryaznukha is a rural locality (a selo) in Beloprudskoye Rural Settlement, Danilovsky District, Volgograd Oblast, Russia. The population was 161 as of 2010. There are 3 streets.

Geography 
Gryaznukha is located in steppe, on the left bank of the Kraishevka River, 63 km north of Danilovka (the district's administrative centre) by road. Kraishevo is the nearest rural locality.

References 

Rural localities in Danilovsky District, Volgograd Oblast